Pseudathyma nzoia, the streaked false sergeant, is a butterfly in the family Nymphalidae. It is found in Kenya (from the western part of the country to the Kakamega Forest and Mount Elgon) and Uganda (Mount Elgon, the Kalinzu Forest in Ankole and the western part of the country).

References

Butterflies described in 1939
Pseudathyma